This is a list of Marathi cinema actresses. Marathi cinema refers to Indian films produced in Marathi, the language of the state of Maharashtra, India. Based in old Mumbai, it is the oldest and one of the pioneer film industries of India.

A
 Aditi Bhagwat
 Aditi Sarangdhar
 Alka Kaushal 
 Alka Kubal
 Amruta Subhash
 Amruta Khanvilkar
 Anjali Patil
 Anuja Sathe
 Anita Date-Kelkar
 Ankita Lokhande
 Apurva Nemlekar
 Archana Joglekar 
 Asawari Joshi 
 Asha Patil 
 Ashalata Wabgaonkar 
 Ashwini Bhave
 Ashwini Ekbote

B
 Bhagyashree 
 Bharati Achrekar 
 Bhargavi Chirmule 
 Bhavana Balsavar

C
 Chandana Sharma

D
 Deepa Parab 
 Deepika Joshi-Shah 
 Durga Khote

G
 Gautami Deshpande
 Girija Joshi 
 Girija Oak

H 
 Heena Panchal
 Harshada Khanvilkar
 Harshada Gaikwad
 Hruta Durgule

J
 Jayshree Gadkar 
 Jayshree T. 
 Jyoti Subhash

K
 Kadambari Danave 
 Kadambari Kadam
 Kamlabai Gokhale 
 Kavita Lad 
 Ketaki Mategaonkar 
 Kishori Godbole 
 Kishori Shahane

L
 Lalita Pawar 
 Laxmi Chhaya 
 Leena Bhagwat

M
 Madhuri Dixit
 Manasi Salvi 
 Manasi Naik
 Manava Naik 
 Medha Manjrekar 
 Meenakshi Shirodkar 
 Megha Dhade 
 Mitali Mayekar
 Mrinal Kulkarni 
 Mrunmayee Deshpande
 Mrinmayee Godbole
 Mukta Barve

N
 Nanda Karnataki 
 Nayana Apte Joshi 
 Neena Kulkarni 
 Neha Joshi
 Neha Mahajan 
 Neha Pendse 
 Neha Shitole
 Nikki Tamboli
 Nishigandha Wad 
 Nagma 
 Nivedita Joshi-Saraf

P
 Padma Chavan 
 Pallavi Joshi 
 Pallavi Patil
 Pallavi Subhash
 Pooja Sawant 
 Prateeksha Lonkar
 Prajakta Mali
 Priya Bapat
 Priya Tendulkar

R
 Radhika Apte 
 Ranjana Deshmukh 
 Rasika Joshi 
 Rasika Sunil
 Reema Lagoo 
 Renuka Shahane
 Rinku Rajguru 
 Rohini Hattangadi
 Rutuja Bagwe
 Ritika Shrotri

S
 Saiee Manjrekar
 Sai Tamhankar
 Saloni Daini 
 Samidha Guru 
 Sandhya Shantaram 
 Sanskruti Balgude 
 Seema Biswas 
 Seema Deo 
 Shakuntala Paranjpye 
 Sharvani Pillai 
 Shilpa Tulaskar 
 Shivani Surve
 Shriya Pilgaonkar 
 Shubha Khote
 Shweta Shinde
 Smita Gondkar
 Smita Patil 
 Smita Talwalkar 
 Smita Tambe 
 Sonalee Kulkarni 
 Sonali Bendre 
 Sonali Khare 
 Sonali Kulkarni 
 Spruha Joshi
 Suchitra Bandekar
 Suhas Joshi 
 Suhasini Mulay 
 Sulabha Deshpande
 Sukanya Kulkarni
 Sulekha Talwalkar 
 Sulochana Latkar 
 Supriya Pathare 
 Supriya Pilgaonkar 
 Surabhi Hande
 Sushma Shiromani 
 Suzanne Bernert
 Seema Shinde

T
 Tanvi Azmi 
 Tanvi Kishore 
 Tejashri Pradhan 
 Tejaswini Pandit
 Tejaswini Lonari
 Tisca Chopra 
 Trupti Bhoir

U
 Urmilla Kothare
 Urmila Matondkar 
 Usha Chavan
 Usha Jadhav 
 Usha Kiran 
 Usha Nadkarni
 Usha Naik
 Uttara Baokar

V
 Vaibhavi Shandilya 
 Vaidehi Parashurami
 Vandana Gupte 
 Varsha Usgaonkar 
 Vibhavari Deshpande

References

External links
 

Marathi cinema
Actresses in Marathi cinema
Marathi actresses